Tracy Stone-Manning (born 1965) is an American environmental policy advisor who is the current director of the Bureau of Land Management in the Biden administration.

Early life and education 
Stone-Manning was born in Springfield, Virginia. She earned a Bachelor of Arts degree in radio, television, and film from the University of Maryland, College Park, and a Master of Science in environmental studies from the University of Montana.

Career 
From 1999 to 2006, Stone-Manning was the director of the Clark Fork Coalition, an environmental protection organization based in Missoula, Montana. She joined the U.S. Senate office of Jon Tester, serving as his regional director from 2007 to 2012 and acting state staff director and senior advisor in 2012.

Upon taking office, Governor Steve Bullock appointed Stone-Manning to succeed Richard Opper as director of the Montana Department of Environmental Quality. From January 2013 to November 2014, Stone-Manning served as the director. From November 2014 to December 2017, she was the chief of staff for Montana Governor Bullock. Since 2017, Stone-Manning has worked for the National Wildlife Federation, first as associate vice president for public lands and then as a senior advisor for conservation policy.

Interior Department Nomination
President Joe Biden nominated Stone-Manning for director of the Bureau of Land Management on April 22, 2021. Hearings on her nomination were held on June 8, 2021. The committee deadlocked on her nomination on July 22, 2021, forcing the entire Senate to discharge the nomination. On July 27, 2021, the United States Senate voted 50–49 on the motion to discharge her nomination from the Senate Committee on Energy and Natural Resources. On September 30, 2021, the Senate confirmed her nomination by a vote of 50–45. Those who had voted against her were uniformly Republican; some stated that her earlier connection to what they claimed to be "eco-terrorism" was disqualifying. 

She started work on October 7, 2021, and was sworn in on October 27.

Personal life 
In 1989, a friend of Stone-Manning's, and fellow environmental activist, was involved in tree spiking in Idaho's Clearwater National Forest. At the friend's behest, Stone-Manning wrote an anonymous letter to federal officials, informing them of the tree spiking and warning that "a lot of people could get hurt" if logging were to continue. In her 1993 federal court testimony, Stone-Manning admitted that she had retyped, edited, and mailed the letter. She received prosecutorial immunity in order to testify against the activist. The activist was found guilty and sentenced to 17 months in prison.

As of 2021, Stone-Manning lives in Missoula, Montana with her husband, author, and journalist Richard Manning.

References 

1965 births
Living people
Biden administration personnel
Bureau of Land Management personnel
State cabinet secretaries of Montana
People from Missoula, Montana
People from Springfield, Virginia
University of Maryland, College Park alumni
University of Montana alumni